Déclic et des claques is a 1965 Italian and French film directed by Philippe Clair.

Cast
Annie Girardot	... 	Sandra
Mike Marshall	... 	Vivi
Philippe Clair	... 	Jean-Philippe
Georges Blaness	... 	Georges (as Georges Blanes)
André Nader	... 	Ferdinand
Robert Gadel	... 	Bobby
Muriel Baptiste	... 	Pistache
Carla Marlier	... 	Alexandra
Pierre Doris	... 	Philippe
Marthe Villalonga	... 	Madame Nino
Renée Saint-Cyr	... 	Ferdinand's mother
Enrico Macias	... 	as himself
Darry Cowl	... 	a guest
Lucien Layani
Jean Gras

References

External links
 

1965 films
Italian comedy films
French comedy films
1960s French-language films
1960s French films
1960s Italian films